Narayan Kaji Shrestha, alias Prakash, is a Nepali communist politician. He has been affiliated with a number of communist parties throughout his political career, holding leadership positions. He was a freedom fighter for the democratic movement to abolish the Panchayat system in the 1980s. He remained in the political mainstream during the Maoist civil war and acted as a mediator. After the peaceful settlement of the conflict, he formally joined the Maoist party and has held important political positions since 2008.
He has held the offices of the Deputy prime minister of Nepal, Home minister, foreign minister, cabinet spokesperson, Member of Constituent Assembly and Member of Parliament, among others.

Early life 

Narayan Kaji Shrestha was born in Jaubari village of Gorkha and holds a master's degree in public administration. He edited the weekly paper "Mulankyan", "Garjan" and "Janamat". He was a mathematics lecturer in the 1980s at Siddhartha Vanasthali Institute.

Political career 

He joined Nepal's communist movement in 1980. He was a second rung leader in the CPN-Unity Centre before its major leaders formed CPN-Maoist and opted for an armed rebellion in 1996. He, however, did not join the rebellion on the grounds of working policy but helped it from outside while continuing with his peaceful political activities despite being underground as general secretary of the Unity Centre. Prakash fell away from Prachanda after the CPN-Unity Centre decided to wage an armed revolt in 1996. Addressing his first public function, Prakash said the road to republic was still full of obstacles and that all forces that believe in democratic republic, should unite.

He played a role in bringing the seven parties and CPN-Maoist together in creating the 12-point Understanding for the democracy movement in mid-April 2006. The movement culminated into a success with the king agreeing to hand over power to the seven parties.

In July 2008, he became a nominated Constituent Assembly member, representing Janamorcha Nepal. His party 'Unity Center, Masal' united with NCP Maoist on January 13, 2009. Prakash became the deputy leader of the parliamentary party of Unified Maoist. After that, Prakash got major responsibilities in the unified Nepal communist party, Maoist. He was given control of the Parliamentary and governmental procedures before he was made the deputy leader of the Unified Maoist in the parliament.

On 2 August 2011, Shrestha was sworn in as Deputy Prime Minister and Home Minister in the final cabinet expansion of the Jhalanath Khanal's (CPN-UML) led government. After Prime Minister Khanal's resignation on 14 August 2011, he remained in those positions in an acting capacity. On 4 September, he was sworn in as Deputy Prime Minister and Foreign Minister in the new Unified Communist Party of Nepal (Maoist) coalition government led by Prime Minister Dr. Baburam Bhattarai. On 7 September 2011, he was appointed official government spokesman. From 19–26 September 2011, he participated in the United Nations General Assembly in New York.

References

Living people
People from Gorkha District
Communist Party of Nepal (Unity Centre) politicians
Communist Party of Nepal (Maoist Centre) politicians
Year of birth missing (living people)
Members of the National Assembly (Nepal)
Nepal Communist Party (NCP) politicians
Government ministers of Nepal
Foreign Ministers of Nepal
People of the Nepalese Civil War
Deputy Prime Ministers of Nepal
Members of the 1st Nepalese Constituent Assembly